Alexander Simpson Hutchinson Forsyth (29 September 1928 – 30 March 2020) was a Scottish footballer who played in the Scottish Football League for Albion Rovers and East Stirlingshire and in the English Football League for Darlington in the 1950s. He also played junior football for Linlithgow Rose. After retiring as a player because of injury, he went on to work as chief scout for East Stirlingshire, and later became a director of the club.

Forsyth died in Falkirk on 30 March 2020.

Notes

References

1928 births
2020 deaths
Footballers from Falkirk (council area)
Scottish footballers
Association football wingers
Linlithgow Rose F.C. players
Albion Rovers F.C. players
Darlington F.C. players
East Stirlingshire F.C. players
Scottish Junior Football Association players
Scottish Football League players
English Football League players